Café society was the description of the "Beautiful People" and "Bright Young Things" who gathered in fashionable cafés and restaurants in New York, Paris and London beginning in the late 19th century. Maury Henry Biddle Paul is credited with coining the phrase "café society" in 1915.

Members attended each other's private dinners and balls, and took holidays in exotic locations or at elegant resorts. In the United States, café society came to the fore with the end of Prohibition in December 1933 and the rise of photojournalism to describe the set of people who tended to do their entertaining semi-publicly—in restaurants and night clubs—and who would include among them movie stars and sports celebrities. Some of the American night clubs and New York City restaurants frequented by the denizens of café society included the 21 Club, El Morocco, Restaurant Larue, and the Stork Club.

See also
 1920s Berlin
 Années folles
 Golden Twenties
 Jazz Age
 Paris between the Wars (1919–1939)
 Roaring Twenties
 Jet set

Bibliography

References

Further reading

External links
 

Upper class culture
Social groups
Sociolinguistics
Roaring Twenties